The FÉG 37M is a Hungarian semi-automatic pistol based on a design by Rudolf Frommer.

Design
It was an improvement over the earlier Frommer 29M. It was made in 2 chamberings. The .380 ACP (9x17mmSR) chambered version was used by the Hungarian Army, while the .32 ACP (7.65x17mmSR) version was supplied to Hungary's German allies during World War II. The former, was known in Hungarian service as the M1937.

The latter, in German service during World War II, was known as Pistole 37(u), pistole M 37 Kal. 7,65 mm or P37. The main difference between this and the other variants is that the "German" version had a manual safety (which the Hungarian issue did not have) and was marked "Pistole M 37 Kal. 7.65" and the FEG code "jhv" and date, along with the Waffenamt markings. Though it was produced under more strain due to the rate by which they wanted them produced, it was still a reliable pistol. 150 - 300,000 pistols were completed this way. Some partially finished post war models were also issued, and there was an attempt to produce the gun after the war, but without success.

See also
 Weapons employed in the Slovak-Hungarian War
 Femaru M37 pistol explained - ebook by Gerard Henrotin (Published at HLebooks.com in February 2016)

References

External links

World War II infantry weapons
Semi-automatic pistols of Hungary
Hungarian inventions
World War II infantry weapons of Germany
Fegyver- és Gépgyár firearms
.32 ACP semi-automatic pistols
.380 ACP semi-automatic pistols